Bertinetti is a surname. Notable people with the surname include:

 Franco Bertinetti (1923 – 1995), Italian fencer
 Marcello Bertinetti (1885 – 1967), Italian fencer
 Marcello Bertinetti (fencer born 1952) (born 1952), Italian fencer

See also 

 Bertinotti